Elections were held in Northumberland County, Ontario, on October 25, 2010, in conjunction with municipal elections across the province.

Northumberland County Council

Alnwick/Haldimand

Brighton

Cobourg

Cramahe

Hamilton

Port Hope

Trent Hills

2010 Ontario municipal elections
Northumberland County, Ontario